This article lists and summarizes the war crimes that have violated the laws and customs of war since the Hague Conventions of 1899 and 1907.

Since many war crimes are not prosecuted (due to lack of political will, lack of effective procedures, or other practical and political reasons), historians and lawyers will frequently make a serious case in order to prove that war crimes occurred, even though the alleged perpetrators of these crimes were never formally prosecuted because investigations cleared them of all charges.

Under international law, war crimes were formally defined as crimes during international trials such as the Nuremberg Trials and the Tokyo Trials, in which Austrian, German and Japanese leaders were prosecuted for war crimes which were committed during World War II.

1899–1902 Second Boer War 

The term "concentration camp" was used to describe camps operated by the British Empire in South Africa during the Second Boer War in the years 1900–1902. As Boer farms were destroyed by the British under their "scorched earth" policy, many tens of thousands of women and children were forcibly moved into the concentration camps. Over 26,000 Boer women and children were to perish in these concentration camps.

Six officers from the Bushveldt Carbineers were court-martialed for massacring POWs and civilians. Lieutenants Harry Morant, Peter Handcock, and George Witton were each found guilty of murder and sentenced to death. Morant and Handcock were executed, while Witton was reprieved and served a short prison sentence. Two of the other defendants, Major Robert Lenehan and Lieutenant Henry Picton, were found guilty of lesser charges. They were dismissed from the military and deported from South Africa after being found guilty of neglecting one's duty and manslaughter, respectively. The last defendant, Captain Alfred Taylor, was acquitted.

1899–1902 Philippine–American War 

Reported American war crimes and atrocities during the Philippine–American War included the summary execution of civilians and prisoners, burning of villages, rape, and torture. 298,000 Filipinos were also moved to concentration camps, where thousands died.

In November 1901, the Manila correspondent of the Philadelphia Ledger wrote: "The present war is no bloodless, opera bouffe engagement; our men have been relentless, have killed to exterminate men, women, children, prisoners and captives, active insurgents and suspected people from lads of ten up, the idea prevailing that the Filipino as such was little better than a dog".

In response to the Balangiga massacre, which wiped out a U.S. company garrisoning Samar town, U.S. Brigadier General Jacob H. Smith launched a retaliatory march across Samar with the instructions: "I want no prisoners. I wish you to kill and burn, the more you kill and burn the better it will please me. I want all persons killed who are capable of bearing arms in actual hostilities against the United States".

1904–1908: Herero Wars 

In August, German General Lothar von Trotha defeated the Ovaherero in the Battle of Waterberg and drove them into the desert of Omaheke, where most of them died of dehydration. In October, the Nama people also rebelled against the Germans, only to suffer a similar fate. Between 24,000 and 100,000 Hereros, 10,000 Nama and an unknown number of San died in the parallel Herero and Namaqua genocide. Once defeated, thousands of Hereros and Namas were also imprisoned in concentration camps, where the majority died of diseases, abuse, and exhaustion. German soldiers also regularly engaged in gang rapes before killing the women or leaving them in the desert to die; a number of Herero women were also forced into involuntary prostitution.

1912-1913: Balkan Wars 
The Balkan Wars were marked by ethnic cleansing with all parties being responsible for grave atrocities against civilians and helped inspire later atrocities including war crimes during the 1990s Yugoslav Wars.

Massacres of Albanians in the Balkan Wars were perpetrated on several occasions by Serbian and Montenegrin armies and paramilitaries. According to contemporary accounts, between 10,000 and 25,000 Albanians were killed or died because of hunger and cold during that period; many of the victims were children, women and the elderly. In addition to the massacres, some civilians had their tongues, lips, ears and noses severed. Philip J. Cohen also cited Durham as saying that Serbian soldiers helped bury people alive in Kosovo. American relief commissioner Willar Howard said in a 1914 Daily Mirror interview that General Carlos Popovitch would shout, "Don't run away, we are brothers and friends. We don't mean to do any harm." Peasants who trusted Popovitch were shot or burned to death, and elderly women unable to leave their homes were also burned. Yugoslavia from a Historical Perspective, a 2017 study published in Belgrade by the Helsinki Committee for Human Rights in Serbia, said that villages were burned to ashes and Albanian Muslims forced to flee when Serbo-Montenegrin forces invaded Kosovo in 1912. Some chronicles cited decapitation as well as mutilation.

Serbian army also brutally suppressed the Tikveš uprising and terrorized the Bulgarian population in the rebelling regions. According to some sources 363 civilian Bulgarians were killed in Kavadarci, 230 - in Negotino and 40 - in Vatasha.

1914–1918: World War I 

World War I was the first major international conflict to take place following the codification of war crimes at the Hague Convention of 1907, including derived war crimes, such as the use of poisons as weapons, as well as crimes against humanity, and derivative crimes against humanity, such as torture, and genocide. Before, the Second Boer War took place after the Hague Convention of 1899. The Second Boer War (1899 until 1902) is known for the first concentration camps (1900 until 1902) for civilians in the 20th century.

1915–1920: First and Second Caco War
 During the First (1915) and Second (1918–1920) Caco Wars waged during the United States occupation of Haiti (1915–1934), human rights abuses were committed against the native Haitian population. Overall, American troops and the Haitian gendarmerie killed several thousands of Haitian civilians during the rebellions between 1915 and 1920, though the exact death toll is unknown.
 Mass killings of civilians were allegedly committed by United States Marines and their subordinates in the Haitian gendarmerie. According to Haitian historian Roger Gaillard, such killings involved rape, lynchings, summary executions, burning villages and deaths by burning. Internal documents of the United States Army justified the killing of women and children, describing them as "auxiliaries" of rebels. A private memorandum of the Secretary of the Navy criticized "indiscriminate killings against natives". American officers who were responsible for acts of violence were given Creole names such as "Linx" for Commandant Freeman Lang and "Ouiliyanm" for Lieutenant Lee Williams. According to American journalist H. J. Seligman, Marines would practice "bumping off Gooks", describing the shooting of civilians in a manner which was similar to killing for sport.
 During the Second Caco War of 1918–1919, many Caco prisoners were summarily executed by Marines and the gendarmerie on orders from their superiors. On June 4, 1916, Marines executed caco General Mizrael Codio and ten others after they were captured in Fonds-Verrettes. In Hinche in January 1919, Captain Ernest Lavoie of the gendarmerie, a former United States Marine, allegedly ordered the killing of nineteen caco rebels according to American officers, though no charges were ever filed against him due to the fact that no physical evidence of the killing was ever presented.
 The torture of Haitian rebels and the torture of Haitians who were suspected of rebelling against the United States was a common practice among the occupying Marines. Some of the methods of torture included the use of water cure, hanging prisoners by their genitals and ceps, which involved pushing both sides of the tibia with the butts of two guns.

1921–1927: Rif War
 During the Rif War, Spanish forces used chemical weapons against Berber rebels and civilians in Morocco. These attacks marked the first widespread employment of gas warfare in the post-WWI era. The Spanish army indiscriminately used phosgene, diphosgene, chloropicrin and mustard gas against civilian populations, markets and rivers. Spain signed the Geneva Protocol in 1925, that prohibited chemical and biological warfare, while simultaneously employing these weapons across the Mediterranean.
 According to Miguel Alonso, Alan Kramer and Javier Rodrigo in the book Fascist Warfare, 1922–1945: Aggression, Occupation, Annihilation: "Apart from deciding not to use chemical weapons, Franco's campaign to 'cleanse Spain' resembled that in Morocco: intelligence-gathering through torture, summary executions, forced labour, rape, and the sadistic killing of military prisoners."
 Spanish mutilations of captured Moroccans were reported, including castration and severing heads, noses and ears, which were collected by Spanish legionnaries as war trophies and worn as necklaces or spiked on bayonets.
 On August 9, 1921, the Massacre of Monte Arruit occurred, in which 2,000 soldiers of the Spanish Army were killed by Riffian forces after surrendering the Monte Arruit garrison near Al Aaroui following a 12-day siege.

1923–1932: Pacification of Libya
 The Pacification of Libya resulted in mass deaths of the indigenous people in Cyrenaica by Italy. 80,000 or over a quarter of the indigenous people in Cyrenaica perished during the pacification.
 100,000 Bedouin citizens were ethnically cleansed by expulsion from their land.
 Specific war crimes alleged to have been committed by the Italian armed forces against civilians include deliberate bombing of civilians, killing unarmed children, women, and the elderly, rape and disembowelment of women, throwing prisoners out of aircraft to their death and running over others with tanks, regular daily executions of civilians in some areas, and bombing tribal villages with mustard gas bombs beginning in 1930.

1927-1949: Chinese Civil War
During the Chinese Civil War both the Nationalists and Communists carried out mass atrocities, with millions of non-combatants deliberately killed by both sides. Benjamin Valentino has estimated atrocities in the Chinese Civil War resulted in the death of between 1.8 million and 3.5 million people between 1927 and 1949.
Over several years after the 1927 Shanghai massacre, the Kuomintang killed between 300,000 and one million people, primarily peasants, in anti-communist campaigns as part of the White Terror. During the White Terror, the Nationalists specifically targeted women with short hair who had not been subjected to foot binding, on the presumption that such "non-traditional" women were radicals. Nationalist forces cut off their breasts, shaved their heads, and displayed their mutilated bodies to intimidate the populace. From 1946 to 1949, the Nationalists arrested, tortured, and killed political dissidents via the Sino-American Cooperative Organization.
During the December 1930 Futian incident, the communists executed 2,000 to 3,000 members of the Futian battalion after its leaders had mutinied against Mao Zedong. Between 1931 and 1934 in the Jiangxi–Fujian Soviet, the communist authorities engaged in a widespread campaign of violence against civilians to ensure compliance with its policies and to stop defection to the advancing KMT, including mass executions, land confiscation and forced labor. According to Li Weihan, a high-ranking communist in Jiangxi at the time, in response to mass flight of civilians to KMT held areas, the local authorities authorities would "usually to send armed squads after those attempting to flee and kill them on the spot, producing numerous mass graves throughout the CSR [Chinese Soviet Republic in Jiangxi] that would later be uncovered by the KMT and its allies." Zhang Wentian, another high-ranking communist, reported that "the policy of annihilating landlords as an exploiting class had degenerated into a massacre" The population of the communist controlled area fell by 700,000 from 1931 and 1935, of which a large proportion were murdered as “class enemies,” worked to death, committed suicide, or died in other circumstances attributable to the communists.
During the Siege of Changchun the People's Liberation Army implemented a military blockade on the KMT-held city of Changchun and prevented civilians from leaving the city during the blockade; this blockade caused the starvation of tens to 150 thousand civilians. The PLA continued to use siege tactics throughout Northeast China.
At the outbreak of the Chinese Civil War in 1946, Mao Zedong began to push for a return to radical policies to mobilize China against the landlord class, but protected the rights of middle peasants and specified that rich peasants were not landlords. The 7 July Directive of 1946 set off eighteen months of fierce conflict in which all rich peasant and landlord property of all types was to be confiscated and redistributed to poor peasants. Party work teams went quickly from village to village and divided the population into landlords, rich, middle, poor, and landless peasants. Because the work teams did not involve villagers in the process, however, rich and middle peasants quickly returned to power.  The Outline Land Law of October 1947 increased the pressure. Those condemned as landlords were buried alive, dismembered, strangled and shot.
In response to the aforementioned land reform campaign; the Kuomintang helped establish the "Huanxiang Tuan", or Homecoming Legion, which was composed of landlords who sought the return of their redistributed land and property from peasants and CCP guerrillas, as well as forcibly conscripted peasants and communist POWs. The Homecoming legion conducted its guerrilla warfare campaign against CCP forces and purported collaborators up until the end of the civil war in 1949.

1935–1937: Second Italo-Abyssinian War
 Italian use of mustard gas against Ethiopian soldiers in 1936 violated the 1925 Geneva Protocol, which bans the use of chemical weapons in warfare.
 Crimes by Ethiopian troops included the use of dum-dum bullets (in violation of the Hague Conventions), the killing of civilian workmen (including during the Gondrand massacre), and the mutilation of captured Eritrean Ascari and Italians (often with castration), beginning in the first weeks of war.
 Yekatit 12—In response to the unsuccessful assassination of Rodolfo Graziani on 19 February 1937, thousands of Ethiopians were killed, including all of the monks residing at Debre Libanos, and over a thousand more detained at Danan who were then exiled either to the Dahlak Islands or Italy.
 The Ethiopians recorded 275,000 combatants killed in action, 78,500 patriots (guerrilla fighters) killed during the occupation, 17,800 civilians killed by aerial bombardment and 30,000 in the February 1937 massacre, 35,000 people died in concentration camps, 24,000 patriots executed by Summary Courts, 300,000 people died of privation due to the destruction of their villages, amounting to 760,300 deaths.

1936–1939: Spanish Civil War

At least 50,000 people were executed during the Spanish Civil War. In his updated history of the Spanish Civil War, Antony Beevor writes, "Franco's ensuing 'white terror' claimed 200,000 lives. The 'red terror' had already killed 38,000." Julius Ruiz concludes that "although the figures remain disputed, a minimum of 37,843 executions were carried out in the Republican zone with a maximum of 150,000 executions (including 50,000 after the war) in Nationalist Spain."

César Vidal puts the number of Republican victims at 110,965. In 2008 a Spanish judge, Socialist Baltasar Garzón, opened an investigation into the executions and disappearances of 114,266 people between 17 July 1936 and December 1951. Among the murders and executions investigated was that of poet and dramatist Federico García Lorca.

1939–1945: World War II

1946–1954: Indochina War 
The French Union's struggle against the independence movement backed by the Soviet Union and China claimed 400,000 to 1.5 million Vietnamese lives from 1945 to 1954. In the Haiphong massacre of November 1946, about 6,000 Vietnamese were killed by French naval artillery. The French employed electric shock treatment during interrogations of the Vietnamese, and nearly 10,000 Vietnamese perished in French concentration camps.

According to Arthur J. Dommen, the Viet Minh assassinated 100,000–150,000 civilians during the war, while Benjamin Valentino estimates that the French were responsible for 60,000 to 250,000 civilian deaths.

About French massacres and war crimes during the conflict, Christopher Goscha wrote on The Penguin History of Modern Vietnam: "Rape became a disturbing weapon used by the Expeditionary Corps, as did summary executions. Young Vietnamese women who could not escape approaching enemy patrols smeared themselves with any stinking thing they could find, including human excrement. Decapitated heads were raised on sticks, bodies were gruesomely disemboweled, and body parts were taken as 'souvenirs'; Vietnamese soldiers of all political colors also committed such acts. The non-communist nationalist singer, Phạm Duy, wrote a bone-chilling ballad about the mothers of Gio Linh village in central Vietnam, each of whom had lost a son to a French Army massacre in 1948. Troops decapitated their bodies and displayed their heads along a public road to strike fear into those tempted to accept the Democratic Republic of Vietnam's sovereignty. Massacres did not start with the Americans in My Lai, or the Vietnamese communists in Hue in 1968. And yet, the French Union's massacre of over two hundred Vietnamese women and children in My Tratch in 1948 remains virtually unknown in France to this day."

1947–1948: Malagasy Uprising 
During the French suppression of the pro-independence Malagasy Uprising, numerous atrocities were carried out such as mass killings, village burnings, torture, war rape, collective punishment, and throwing live prisoners out of airplanes (death flights). Between 11,000 and 90,000 Malagasy died in the fighting, along with about 800 French soldiers and other Europeans.

1948 Arab–Israeli War 

Several massacres were committed during this war which could be described as war crimes. Nearly 15,000 people, mostly combatants and militants, were killed during the war, including 6,000 Jews and about 8,000 Arabs.

1945–1949: Indonesian War of Independence 
 South Sulawesi Campaign, about 4,500 civilians killed by Pro-Indonesian and Indonesian forces and pro-Dutch and Dutch colonial forces (KNIL).
 Rawagede massacre: about 431 civilians killed by Dutch forces
 Bersiap massacre: about 25,000 Indo-European civilians, Dutch, and loyalists killed by Indonesian nationalist forces.
 Indonesian National Revolution: About 100–150,000 Chinese, Communists, Europeans (French, German, British), pro-Dutch etc. were killed by Indonesian nationalist forces and Indonesian youth.

1948–1960: Malayan Emergency 
 War crimes: In the Batang Kali massacre, about 24 unarmed villagers were killed by British troops. The British government claimed that these villagers were insurgents attempting to escape but this was later known to be entirely false as they were unarmed, nor actually supporting the insurgents nor attempting to escape after being detained by British troops. No British soldier was prosecuted for the murder at Batang Kali.
 War crimes: includes beating, torturing, and killing by British troops and communist insurgents of non-combatants.
 War crimes: As part of the Briggs Plan devised by British General Sir Harold Briggs, 500,000 people (roughly ten percent of Malaya's population) were eventually removed from the land and interned in guarded camps called "New Villages". The intent of this measure was to isolate villagers from contact with insurgents. While considered necessary, some of the cases involving the widespread destruction went beyond justification of military necessity. This practice was prohibited by the Geneva Conventions and customary international law which stated that the destruction of property must not happen unless rendered absolutely necessary by military operations.

1950–1953: Korean War

United States perpetrated crimes

North Korean perpetrated crimes 

 Rudolph Rummel estimated that the North Korean Army executed at least 500,000 civilians during the Korean War with many dying in North Korea's drive to conscript South Koreans to their war effort. Throughout the conflict, North Korean and Chinese forces routinely mistreated U.S. and UN prisoners of war. Mass starvation and diseases swept through the Chinese-run POW camps during the winter of 1950–51. About 43 percent of all U.S. POWs died during this period. In violation of the Geneva Conventions which explicitly stated that captor states must repatriate prisoners of war to their homeland as quickly as possible, North Korea detained South Korean POWs for decades after the ceasefire. Over 88,000 South Korean soldiers were missing and the Communists' themselves had claimed they had captured 70,000 South Koreans.

South Korean perpetrated crimes

1952–1960: Mau Mau uprising 

 In attempt to suppress the insurgency in Kenya, British colonial authorities suspended civil liberties within the country. In response to the rebellion, many Kikuyu were relocated. According to British authorities 80,000 were interned. Caroline Elkins estimated that between 160,000 and 320,000 were moved into concentration camps. Other estimates are as high as 450,000 interned. Most of the remainder – more than a million – were held in "enclosed villages". Although some were Mau Mau guerillas, many were victims of collective punishment that colonial authorities imposed on large areas of the country. Thousands suffered beatings and sexual assaults during "screenings" intended to extract information about the Mau Mau threat. Later, prisoners suffered even worse mistreatment in an attempt to force them to renounce their allegiance to the insurgency and to obey commands. Significant numbers were murdered; official accounts describe some prisoners being roasted alive. Prisoners were questioned with the help of "slicing off ears, boring holes in eardrums, flogging until death, pouring paraffin over suspects who were then set alight, and burning eardrums with lit cigarettes". The British colonial police used a "metal castrating instrument" to cut off testicles and fingers. "By the time I cut his balls off", one settler boasted, "he had no ears, and his eyeball, the right one, I think, was hanging out of its socket. Too bad, he died before we got much out of him." According to David Anderson, the British hanged over 1,090 suspected rebels: far more than the French had executed in Algeria during the Algerian War. Another 400 were sentenced to death but reprieved because they were under 18 or women. The British declared some areas prohibited zones where anyone could be shot. It was common for Kikuyu to be shot because they "failed to halt when challenged."
 The Chuka Massacre, which happened in Chuka, Kenya, was perpetrated by members of the King's African Rifles B Company in June 1953 with 20 unarmed people killed during the Mau Mau uprising. Members of the 5th KAR B Company entered the Chuka area on June 13, 1953, to flush out rebels suspected of hiding in the nearby forests. Over the next few days, the regiment had captured and executed 20 people suspected of being Mau Mau fighters for unknown reasons. It is found out that most of the people executed were actually belonged to the Kikuyu Home Guard – a loyalist militia recruited by the British to fight an increasingly powerful and audacious guerrilla enemy. The commanding officer of the soldiers responsible, Major Gerald Griffiths, was court-martialed for murder. He was found guilty and sentenced to 7 years in prison. In an atmosphere of atrocity and reprisal, the matter was swept under the carpet and nobody else ever stood trial for the massacre.
 The Hola massacre was an incident during the conflict in Kenya against British colonial rule at a colonial detention camp in Hola, Kenya. By January 1959 the camp had a population of 506 detainees of whom 127 were held in a secluded "closed camp". This more remote camp near Garissa, eastern Kenya, was reserved for the most uncooperative of the detainees. They often refused, even when threats of force were made, to join in the colonial "rehabilitation process" or perform manual labour or obey colonial orders. The camp commandant outlined a plan that would force 88 of the detainees to bend to work. On 3 March 1959, the camp commandant put this plan into action – as a result, 11 detainees were clubbed to death by guards. 77 surviving detainees sustained serious permanent injuries. The British government accepts that the colonial administration tortured detainees, but denies liability.
 The Lari massacre in the settlement of Lari occurred on the night of 25–26 March 1953, in which Mau Mau militants herded Kikuyu men, women and children into huts and set fire to them, killing anyone who attempted to escape. Official estimates place the death toll from the Lari massacre at 74 dead.
 Mau Mau militants also tortured, mutilated and murdered Kikuyu on many occasions. Mau Mau racked up 1,819 murders of their fellow Africans, though again this number excludes the many additional hundreds who 'disappeared', whose bodies were never found.

1954–1962: Algerian War
The insurgency began in 1945 and was revived in 1954, winning independence in the early 1960s. The French army killed thousands of Algerians in the first round of fighting in 1945. After the Algerian independence movement formed a National Liberation Front (FLN) in 1954, the French Minister of the Interior joined the Minister of National Defense in 1955 in ordering that every rebel carrying a weapon, suspected of doing so, or suspected of fleeing, must be shot. French troops executed civilians from nearby villages when rebel attacks occurred, tortured both rebels and civilians, and interned Arabs in camps, where forced labor was required of some of them. 2,000,000 Algerians were displaced or forcibly resettled during the war, and over 800 villages were destroyed from 1957 to 1960.

Other French crimes included deliberate bombing, torture and mutilation of civilians, rape and sexual assaults, disembowelment of pregnant women, imprisonment without food in small cells, throwing detainees from helicopters and into the sea with concrete on their feet, and burying people alive.

The FLN also indulged in a large amount of atrocities, both against French pieds-noirs and against fellow Algerians whom they deemed as supporting the French or simply as refusing to support the Liberation effort. These crimes included killing unarmed children, women and the elderly, rape and disembowelment or decapitation of women and murdering children by slitting their throats or banging their heads against walls. French sources estimated that 70,000 Muslim civilians were killed, or abducted and presumed killed, by the FLN during the war. The FLN also killed 30,000 to 150,000 in people in post-war reprisals.

1955–1975: Vietnam War

United States perpetrated crimes
During the war 95 U.S. Army personnel and 27 U.S. Marine Corps personnel were convicted by court-martial of the murder or manslaughter of Vietnamese.

 "Vietnam War Crimes Working Group" – Briefly declassified (1994) and subsequently reclassified (2002) documentary evidence compiled by a Pentagon task force detailing endemic war crimes committed by U.S. soldiers in Vietnam. Substantiating 320 incidents by Army investigators, includes seven massacres from 1967 through 1971 in which at least 137 South Vietnamese civilians died (not including the ones at My Lai), 78 other attacks on noncombatants in which at least 57 were killed, 56 wounded and 15 sexually assaulted, and 141 instances in which U.S. soldiers tortured civilian detainees or prisoners of war.

South Korean perpetrated crimes

North Vietnamese and Vietcong perpetrated crimes 

 Up to 155,000 refugees fleeing the final North Vietnamese Spring Offensive were alleged to have been killed or abducted on the road to Tuy Hòa in 1975.

1965 Indo-Pakistani War 
 Sepoy Maqbool Hussain was a Pakistani soldier who was wounded and captured by Indian forces during the 1965 War. For the next 40 years, Maqbool was deprived of his rights and was subjected to violent torture during which his Indian counterparts pulled out his finger nails, cut out his tongue since he didn't chant anti Pakistan slogans and various other brutal acts which would've been a violation of the Geneva accords.

Late 1960s – 1998: The Troubles 
 War crimes: Various unarmed male civilians (some of whom were named during a 2013 television programme) were shot, two of them (Patrick McVeigh, Daniel Rooney) fatally, in 1972, allegedly by the Military Reaction Force (MRF), an undercover military unit tasked with targeting Irish Republican Army paramilitaries during the last installment of the Troubles. Two brothers, whose names and casualty status were not mentioned in an article regarding the same matter in The Irish Times, ran a fruit stall in west Belfast, and were shot after being mistaken for IRA paramilitaries.
 War crimes: The British security forces employed widespread torture and waterboarding on prisoners in Northern Ireland during interrogations in the 1970s. Liam Holden was wrongfully arrested by the security forces for the murder of a British Army soldier and became the last person in the United Kingdom to be sentenced to hang after being convicted in 1973, largely on the basis of an unsigned confession produced by torture. His death sentence was commuted to life imprisonment and he spent 17 years behind bars. On 21 June 2012, in the light of CCRC investigations which confirmed that the methods used to extract confessions were unlawful, Holden had his conviction quashed by the Court of Appeal in Belfast, at the age of 58. Former Royal Ulster Constabulary (RUC) interrogators during the Troubles admitted that beatings, the sleep deprivation, waterboarding, and the other tortures were systematic, and were, at times, sanctioned at a very high level within the force.
 War crimes: The British Army and the RUC also operated under a shoot-to-kill policy in Northern Ireland, under which suspects were alleged to have been deliberately killed without any attempt to arrest them. In four separate cases considered by the European court of human rights – involving the deaths of ten IRA men, a Sinn Féin member and a civilian – seven judges ruled unanimously that Article 2 of the European Convention on Human Rights guaranteeing a right to life had been violated by Britain.
 War crimes: British soldiers and police colluded with loyalist paramilitaries, such as the attacks by the Glenanne group, which carried out a string of attacks against Irish Catholics and nationalists in an area of Northern Ireland known as the "murder triangle" and also carried out some attacks in the Republic of Ireland. Evidence suggests that the group was responsible for the deaths of about 120 civilians. The Cassel Report investigated 76 killings attributed to the group and found evidence that British security forces were involved in 74 of those. One former member, RUC officer John Weir, said his superiors knew of the group's activities but allowed it to continue. Attacks attributed to the group include the Dublin and Monaghan bombings (which killed 34 civilians), the Miami Showband killings, the Reavey and O'Dowd killings and the Hillcrest Bar bombing.

1971 Bangladesh Liberation War

1970–1975: Cambodian civil war
The Extraordinary Chambers in the Courts of Cambodia for the Prosecution of Crimes Committed During the Period of Democratic Kampuchea, commonly known as the Cambodia Tribunal, is a joint court established by the Royal Government of Cambodia and the United Nations to try senior members of the Khmer Rouge for crimes against humanity committed during the Cambodian Civil War. The Khmer Rouge killed many people due to their political affiliation, education, class origin, occupation, or ethnicity.

1973 Yom Kippur war

1975-1999: Indonesian invasion and occupation of East Timor

During the 1975 invasion and the subsequent occupation, a significant portion of East Timor's population died. Researcher Ben Kiernan says that "a toll of 150,000 is likely close to the truth", although estimates of 200,000 or higher have been suggested.

1975–1990: Lebanese Civil War

1978–present: Civil war in Afghanistan 
This war has ravaged the country for over 40 years, with several foreign actors playing important roles during different periods. From 2001 until 2021, US and NATO troops took part in the fighting in Afghanistan in the "War on Terror" that is also treated in the corresponding section below.

During the war against the Coalition and Afghan government, the Taliban committed war crimes including massacres, suicide bombing, terrorism, and targeting civilians. United Nations reports have consistently blamed the Taliban and other anti-government forces for the majority of civilian deaths in the conflict, with the Taliban responsible for 75% of civilian deaths in 2011. The Taliban also perpetrated mass rapes and executions of surrendered soldiers.

Following the Taliban takeover of Afghanistan in 2021, the Taliban has also executed civilians and captured insurgents during the ongoing Republican insurgency in Afghanistan.

1980–1988: Iran–Iraq War 

Over 100,000 civilians other than those killed in Saddam's genocide are estimated to have been killed by both sides of the war by R.J.Rummel.

1985–present: Uganda 
The Times reports (November 26, 2005 p. 27):

Almost 20 years of fighting... has killed half a million people. Many of the dead are children... The LRA [a cannibalism cult] kidnaps children and forces them to join its ranks. And so, incredibly, children are not only the main victims of this war, but also its unwilling perpetrators... The girls told me they had been given to rebel commanders as "wives" and forced to bear them children. The boys said they had been forced to walk for days knowing they would be killed if they showed any weakness, and in some cases forced even to murder their family members... every night up to 10,000 children walk into the centre of Kitgum... because they are not safe in their own beds... more than 25,000 children have been kidnapped ...this year an average of 20 children have been abducted every week.
 The International Criminal Court has launched an investigation and has issued indictments against LRA leaders.

1991–1999: Yugoslav wars

1991–1995: Croatian War of Independence
Also see List of ICTY indictees for a variety of war criminals and crimes during this era.

1992–1995: Bosnian War

1998–1999: Kosovo War

1990–2000: Liberia / Sierra Leone 
From The Times March 28, 2006 p. 43:
 "Charles Taylor, the former Liberian President who is one of Africas most wanted men, has gone into hiding in Nigeria to avoid extradition to a UN war crimes tribunal... The UN war crimes tribunal in Sierra Leone holds Mr Taylor responsible for about 250,000 deaths. Throughout the 1990s, his armies and supporters, made up of child soldiers orphaned by the conflict wreaked havoc through a swath of West Africa. In Sierra Leone he supported the Revolutionary United Front (R.U.F) whose rebel fighters were notorious for hacking off the limbs of civilians.
 Current action – Indicted on 17 counts of war crimes and crimes against humanity by the UN, which has issued an international warrant for his arrest. As of April 2006 located, extradited, and facing trial in Sierra Leone but then transferred to the Netherlands as requested by the Liberian government. As of the status of the main state actor in the war crimes in Liberia, Sierra Leone and the ongoing war crimes tribunal in the Hague for violating the UN sanctions, Libya's Muamar Gaddafi was elected to the post of President of the African Union. As of late January, 2011, Exxon/Mobile has resumed explorationary drilling in Libya after the exchange of the Lockerbie bombing terrorist was returned to Libya and Libya was taken off terrorist list by the Bush administration with the legal stipulation that Libya could never be prosecuted for past war crimes(regardless of guilt)in the future.

1990: Invasion of Kuwait

1991–2000/2002: Algerian Civil War 

During the Algerian Civil War of the 1990s, a variety of massacres occurred through the country, many being identified as war crimes. The Armed Islamic Group (GIA) has avowed its responsibility for many of them, while for others no group has claimed responsibility. In addition to generating a widespread sense of fear, these massacres and the ensuing flight of population have resulted in serious depopulation of the worst-affected areas. The massacres peaked in 1997 (with a smaller peak in 1994), and were particularly concentrated in the areas between Algiers and Oran, with very few occurring in the east or in the Sahara.

1994–1996/1999–2009: Russia-Chechnya Wars 

During the First Chechen War (1994–1996) and Second Chechen War (1999–2000 battle phase, 2000–2009 insurgency phase) there were many allegations of war crimes and terrorism against both sides from various human rights organizations.

1998–2006: Second Congo War 

 Civil war 1998–2002, est. 5 million deaths; war "sucked in" Rwanda, Uganda, Angola, Zimbabwe and Namibia, as well as 17,000 United Nations peacekeepers, its "largest and most costly" peace mission and "the bloodiest conflict since the end of the Second World War."
 Fighting involves Mai-Mai militia and Congolese government soldiers. The Government originally armed the Mai-Mai as civil defence against external invaders, who then turned to banditry.
 100,000 refugees living in remote disease ridden areas to avoid both sides
 Estimated 1000 deaths a day according to Oxfam:
 "The army attacks the local population as it passes through, often raping and pillaging like the militias. Those who resist are branded Mai-mai supporters and face detention or death. Sometimes they march the villagers into the bush to work as human mules."
 In 2003, Sinafasi Makelo, a representative of Mbuti Pygmies, told the UN's Indigenous People's Forum that during the Congo Civil War, his people were hunted down and eaten as though they were game animals. Both sides of the war regarded them as "subhuman". Makelo asked the UN Security Council to recognise cannibalism as a crime against humanity and an act of genocide.

2003–2011: Iraq War 
 During the Iraq War
 Blackwater Baghdad shootings On September 16, 2007, Blackwater military contractors shot and killed 17 Iraqi civilians in Nisour Square, Baghdad. The fatalities occurred while a Blackwater Personal Security Detail (PSD) was escorting a convoy of US State Department vehicles en route to a meeting in western Baghdad with United States Agency for International Development officials. The shooting led to the unraveling of the North Carolina-based company, which since has replaced its management and changed its name to Xe Services.
 Beginning in 2004, accounts of physical, psychological, and sexual abuse, including torture, rape, sodomy, and homicide of prisoners held in the Abu Ghraib prison in Iraq (also known as Baghdad Correctional Facility) came to public attention. These acts were committed by military police personnel of the United States Army together with additional US governmental agencies. In January 2014, evidence accuses British troops of being involved in widespread torture and abuse towards Iraqi civilians and prisoners.
 War crimes: 2006 al-Askari Mosque bombing by Al-Qaeda. The bombing was followed by retaliatory violence with over a hundred dead bodies being found the next day and well over 1,000 people killed in the days following the bombing – by some counts, over 1,000 on the first day alone.
 The Mahmudiyah rape and killings were the gang-rape and murder of 14-year-old Iraqi girl Abeer Qassim Hamza al-Janabi and the murder of her family by United States Army soldiers on March 12, 2006. It occurred in the family's house to the southwest of Yusufiyah, a village to the west of the town of Al-Mahmudiyah, Iraq. Other members of al-Janabi's family murdered by Americans included her 34-year-old mother Fakhriyah Taha Muhasen, 45-year-old father Qassim Hamza Raheem, and 6-year-old sister Hadeel Qassim Hamza Al-Janabi. The two remaining survivors of the family, 9-year-old brother Ahmed and 11-year-old brother Mohammed, who were at school during the massacre, were orphaned by the event.
 War crimes: Iraqi insurgent groups have committed many armed attacks and bombings targeting civilians. According to Iraqi Interior Minister Bayan Jabr insurgents killed over 12,000 Iraqis from January 2005 to June 2006, giving the first official count for the victims of bombings, ambushes and other deadly attacks. Iraq Body Count project data shows that 33% of civilian deaths during the Iraq War resulted from execution after abduction or capture. These were overwhelmingly carried out by unknown actors including insurgents, sectarian militias and criminals. See: Iraq War insurgent attacks, List of suicide bombings in Iraq since 2003 and List of massacres of the Iraq War for a more comprehensive list.

2006 Lebanon War 

Allegations of war crimes in the 2006 Lebanon War refer to claims of various groups and individuals, including Amnesty International, Human Rights Watch, and United Nations officials, who accused both Hezbollah and Israel of violating international humanitarian law during the 2006 Lebanon War, and warned of possible war crimes. These allegations included intentional attacks on civilian populations or infrastructure, disproportionate or indiscriminate attacks in densely populated residential districts.

According to various media reports, between 1,000 and 1,200 Lebanese citizens (including Hezbollah fighters) were reported dead; there were between 1,500 and 2,500 people wounded and over 1,000,000 were temporarily displaced. Over 150 Israelis were killed (120 military); thousands wounded; and 300,000–500,000 were displaced because of Hezbollah firing tens of thousands of rockets at major cities in Israel.

2003–2009/2010: Darfur conflict; 2005–2010: Civil war in Chad 

During the Darfur conflict, Civil war in Chad (2005–2010)
The conflict in Darfur has been variously characterised as a genocide.

Sudanese authorities claim a death toll of roughly 19,500 civilians while many non-governmental organizations, such as the Coalition for International Justice, claim over 400,000 people have been killed.

In September 2004, the World Health Organization estimated there had been 50,000 deaths in Darfur since the beginning of the conflict, an 18-month period, mostly due to starvation. An updated estimate the following month put the number of deaths for the six-month period from March to October 2004 due to starvation and disease at 70,000; These figures were criticised, because they only considered short periods and did not include deaths from violence. A more recent British Parliamentary Report has estimated that over 300,000 people have died, and others have estimated even more.

2008–2009 Gaza War 

There were allegations of war crimes by both the Israeli military and Hamas. Criticism of Israel's conduct focused on the proportionality of its measures against Hamas, and on its alleged use of weaponised white phosphorus. Numerous reports from human right groups during the war claimed that white phosphorus shells were being used by Israel, often in or near populated areas. In its early statements the Israeli military denied using any form of white phosphorus, saying "We categorically deny the use of white phosphorus". It eventually admitted to its limited use and stopped using the shells, including as a smoke screen. The Goldstone report investigating possible war crimes in the 2009 war accepted that white phosphorus is not illegal under international law but did find that the Israelis were "systematically reckless in determining its use in build-up areas". It also called for serious consideration to be given to the banning of its use as an obscurant.

2009 Sri Lankan Civil War 

There are allegations that war crimes were committed by the Sri Lankan military and the rebel Liberation Tigers of Tamil Eelam during the Sri Lankan Civil War, particularly during the final months of the conflict in 2009. The alleged war crimes include attacks on civilians and civilian buildings by both sides; executions of combatants and prisoners by the government of Sri Lanka; enforced disappearances by the Sri Lankan military and paramilitary groups backed by them; acute shortages of food, medicine, and clean water for civilians trapped in the war zone; and child recruitment by the Tamil Tigers.

A panel of experts appointed by UN Secretary-General (UNSG) Ban Ki-moon to advise him on the issue of accountability with regard to any alleged violations of international human rights and humanitarian law during the final stages of the civil war found "credible allegations" which, if proven, indicated that war crimes and crimes against humanity were committed by the Sri Lankan military and the Tamil Tigers. The panel has called on the UNSG to conduct an independent international inquiry into the alleged violations of international law. The Sri Lankan government has denied that its forces committed any war crimes and has strongly opposed any international investigation. It has condemned the UN report as "fundamentally flawed in many respects" and "based on patently biased material which is presented without any verification".

2011–present: Syrian civil war 

International organizations have accused the Syrian government, ISIL and other opposition forces of severe human rights violations, with many massacres occurring. Chemical weapons have been used many times during the conflict as well. The Syrian government is reportedly responsible for the majority of civilian casualties and war crimes, often through bombings. In addition, tens of thousands of protesters and activists have been imprisoned and there are reports of torture in state prisons. Over 470,000 people were killed in the war by 2017.

2015–present: Kurdish–Turkish conflict 

According to the U.S. State Department 2016 Human Rights Report, in February 2016, Turkish security forces killed at least 130 people, including unarmed civilians, who had taken shelter in the basements of three buildings in the town of Cizre. A domestic NGO, The Human Rights Association (HRA), said the security forces killed more than 300 civilians in the first eight months of 2016. In March 2017, the United Nations voiced "concern" over the Turkish government's operations and called for an independent assessment of the "massive destruction, killings and numerous other serious human rights violations" against the ethnic Kurdish minority.

2020 Nagorno-Karabakh war 

UN Secretary-General António Guterres stated that "indiscriminate attacks on populated areas anywhere, including in Stepanakert, Ganja and other localities in and around the immediate Nagorno-Karabakh zone of conflict, were totally unacceptable". Amnesty International stated that both Azerbaijani and Armenian forces committed war crimes during recent fighting in Nagorno-Karabakh, and called on Azerbaijani and Armenian authorities to immediately conduct independent, impartial investigations, identify all those responsible, and bring them to justice.

November 2020–present: Tigray War 

During the Tigray War, which included fighting between the Ethiopian National Defense Force (ENDF) soldiers and Tigray People's Liberation Front (TPLF) forces in the Tigray Region, the Ethiopian Human Rights Commission (EHRC) described the 9–10 November 2020 Mai Kadra massacre committed by Tigray youth group "Samri" in its 24 November 2020 preliminary report as "grave human rights violations which may amount to crimes against humanity and war crimes".

2022–present: Russian invasion of Ukraine 

During the Russian invasion of Ukraine, multiple buildings such as airports, hospitals, kindergartens were bombed. There has been abuse of prisoners of war.

In April 2022 bodies of civilians murdered by Russian forces were found in the town of Bucha, which had been left after the occupation of the town. It was confirmed at least more than 300 bodies were in mass graves or stranded on the streets of the city. As of 22 April 2022 there have been more than 500 confirmed bodies.

The Siege of Mariupol started on 24 February 2022 and ended on 20 May 2022. It has been confirmed at thousands of lives have been claimed through the siege and that the city has been reduced to rubble.

On 21 April 2022, Satellite images showed mass graves around the besieged city of Mariupol. It has been confirmed at least 9,000+ bodies have been found since. On the same day Vladimir Putin ordered troops to blockade the Azovstal Steel Plant, the last Ukrainian controlled place in the besieged city of Mariupol. The steel plant had more than 1,000 Ukrainians confirmed inside of it.

On 17 March 2023, the International Criminal Court (ICC) issued arrest warrants for Vladimir Putin and Russia’s Commissioner for Children’s Rights Maria Lvova-Belova for war crimes of deportation and illegal transfer of children from occupied Ukraine to Russia.

See also 

 Crimes against humanity
 Crimes against humanity under communist regimes
 Democide
 Ethnic cleansing
 Geneva Conventions
 Genocide
 Genocides in history
 Genocide of indigenous peoples
 The Holocaust
 Human rights
 International humanitarian law
 International law
 Laws of war
 List of ethnic cleansing campaigns
 List of events named massacres
 List of genocides
 List of most-wanted Nazi war criminals, according to the Simon Wiesenthal Center
 List of war criminals
 Mass killings under communist regimes
 Mass murder
 Military history
 First Italo-Ethiopian War
 Second Italo-Ethiopian War
 First Sino-Japanese War
 Second Sino-Japanese War
 Spanish Civil War
 Torture
 War crime
 World War I
 World War II

Notes

References

External links 
 1944–1945 Killing of Allied POWs in Europe
 A Criminological Analysis of the Invasion and Occupation of Iraq By Ronald C. Kramer and Raymond J. Michalowski
 Kramer, Alan: Atrocities, in: 1914-1918-online. International Encyclopedia of the First World War.

Law of war
Law-related lists
International criminal law

Crime-related lists
Human rights-related lists
Articles containing video clips